Dezaray Hawes (born January 23, 1997) is a Canadian curler from Peachland, British Columbia. She currently plays second on Team Corryn Brown.

Career
Hawes was the second on Team British Columbia skipped by Sarah Daniels at the 2016 Canadian Junior Curling Championships. The team won a silver medal after losing the final to Nova Scotia's Mary Fay. She returned the following year as second for Corryn Brown where the team went 5–5. Hawes also placed fifth with the Daniels rink in 2015 at the 2015 Canada Winter Games.

Hawes won her first World Curling Tour event in 2016 at the Qinghai China Ladies International. She also played in her first Grand Slam of Curling event when she was just 19, the Tour Challenge Tier 2 where her team went 1–3.

Team Brown had multiple playoff appearances in tour events during the 2017–18 season even though they were still a junior team. They lost in the semifinals of the Driving Force Abbotsford Cashspiel and the King Cash Spiel and lost in the quarterfinals of the Kamloops Crown of Curling. She played with Ciera Fischer at the junior provincials however they went 3–4 during the round robin and did not advance to the playoffs. Back with Team Brown, the team made it all the way to the semifinal of the 2018 British Columbia Scotties Tournament of Hearts, the provincial women's curling championship. The rink also won a silver medal at the 2018 U Sports/Curling Canada University Championships, losing the final to Kristen Streifel.

Team Brown played in seven tour events during the 2018–19 season and qualified in six of the seven including winning the King Cash Spiel once again and the Sunset Ranch Kelowna Double Cash. They improved by one spot at the 2019 British Columbia Scotties Tournament of Hearts where they lost the final to Sarah Wark's rink.

In their first event of the 2019–20 season, they missed the playoffs at the Booster Juice Shoot-Out. They then missed the playoffs at the 2019 Colonial Square Ladies Classic. They then made the playoffs at six straight events starting with the Prestige Hotels & Resorts Curling Classic where they made it to the quarterfinals. The following week, they won the Driving Force Decks Int'l Abbotsford Cashspiel and two weeks after that they won the Kamloops Crown of Curling. Their next event was the Tour Challenge Tier 2 where they lost to Jestyn Murphy in the semifinal. They also made the semifinal at the Red Deer Curling Classic. They lost the final of the 2019 China Open in mid-December, their last event of 2019. Hawes won her first provincial title at the 2020 British Columbia Scotties Tournament of Hearts where this year they defeated Wark's rink by stealing the extra end. At the 2020 Scotties Tournament of Hearts, Team BC finished with a 5–6 record and they finished in sixth place.

Team Brown began the 2020–21 curling season by winning the 2020 Sunset Ranch Kelowna Double Cash. Due to the COVID-19 pandemic in British Columbia, the 2021 provincial championship was cancelled. As the reigning provincial champions, Team Brown was invited to represent British Columbia at the 2021 Scotties Tournament of Hearts, which they accepted. At the Hearts, they finished a 4–4 round robin record, failing to qualify for the championship round.

Aside from team curling, Hawes plays mixed doubles with her partner Tyler Tardi. The duo has competed in three Canadian Mixed Doubles Curling Championship with their best finish in 2019 where they lost in the quarterfinals.

Personal life
Hawes works as an administrative assistant for the MNP LLP. She is currently in a relationship with fellow curler Tyler Tardi. She attended Heritage Woods Secondary School and Thompson Rivers University.

Teams

References

External links

1997 births
Canadian women curlers
Curlers from British Columbia
Living people
Sportspeople from New Westminster
People from the Regional District of Central Okanagan